Corallochytrium belongs to the class of Corallochytrea within Teretosporea and is a sister group to Ichthyosporea. Corallochytrium limacisporum is the only species of Corallochytrium known so far. It was first discovered and named in the Arabian Sea’s coral lagoons by Kaghu-Kumar in 1987. It was first thought to be a member of the fungi-like thraustochytrids, however, this was later disproven due to Corallochytriums lack of cilia and sagenogenetosome. Little research has been done on the life cycle or morphology. Most research concerning this genus has been done to uncover the evolution of animals and fungi, as Corallochytrium possess both animal and fungal enzymatic trademarks (C-14 reductase and α-AAR respectively).

Etymology 
The genus name is derived from the habitat in which it was first found: coral reef lagoons. The single species name is derived from the limax-shaped (slug-shaped) spores that are produced by the cell.(Raghu-kumar, 1987)

Taxonomy 
C. limacisporum was first discovered and named in 1987 in coral reef lagoons of three Lakshadweep islands in the Arabian sea; Agatti, Kavaratti and Bangaram (Raghu-kumar, 1987). The organism was initially thought to be a new thraustochytrid protist, a group of protists that closely resemble fungi and produce filaments from which they absorb nutrients (Raghu-kumar 1987). However, Cavalier-Smith & Allsopp (1996) explain that C. limancisporum had been wrongly classified as it lacks all defining characteristics of thraustochytrids. After phylogenetic analysis, Corallochytrium was determined not to be a thraustochytrid, but rather related to choanoflagellates. Cavalier-Smith assigned a new order and class for Corallochytrium under the phylum Choanozoa: Corallochytrida and Corallochytrea respectively (Cavelier-Smith 1995).  Recently, Torruella et al. (2015) revealed that Corallochytrium has a sister group: Ichthyosporea and clusters within Teretosporea, an early branching lineage of unicellular organisms that are thought to be one of the closest relatives to animals (Marshall, 2014)

Corallochytrium has become an important species in unraveling the diversification of animals from fungi and opisthokont evolution. Corallochytrium and Ichthyosporea are thought to be the earliest branches of the holozoans (animals and all their ancestors, excluding fungi) (Torruella et al. 2015). However new phylogenetic trees placing Corallochytrium closer to fungi are emerging  (Sumanthi et al. 2006). Phylogenetic trees based on the α-AAR gene, put Corallochytrium as a sister group to fungi, however trees using other genes, such as C-14 reductase, have been inconclusive in their placement in relation to animals or fungi (Sumanthi et al. 2006).

Description
Corallochytrium is a small (around 5–20μm in diameter), round, non-photosynthetic choanoflagellate (Torruella et al. 2015, Cavalier-Smith & Allsopp, 1996). It possesses no cilia (despite being a choanoflagellate) and no sagenogenetosome (Cavalier-Smith, 2001). It has a thin wall of unknown composition, that does not resemble that of fungi (Cavalier-Smith, 2001). Like fungi and choanoflagellates, Corallochytrium  has flat mitochondrial cristae (Cavalier-Smith, 2001).

Habitat and ecology 
Little is known about Corallochytrium'''s feeding and ecology, however its feeding regime has strong implications for the evolution of animals and fungi. Corallochytrium is a marine protist that inhabits coral reef lagoons in the Arabian Sea (Raghu-kumar, 1987). C. limacisporum is predatory and feeds on large eukaryotic prey (Hehenberger et al. 2017). Corallochytrium has the fungal signature α-aminoadipate reductase (α-AAR) which is involved in the α-aminoadipate (AAA) pathway that synthesises amino acids from inorganic nitrogen in fungi (Sumathi et al. 2006). α-AAR is an evolutionarily conserved enzyme in the fungi (Sumathi at al., 2006).. The presence of α-AAR in Corallochytrium suggests it is a sister clade to fungi. Like fungi, Corallochytrium has also been found to be saprotrophic (Cavalier-Smith & Allsopp, 1996). Coralochytrium also possess the sterol C-14 reductase gene involved in animal and fungi sterol pathways (Sumathi at al., 2006).

 Life cycle 
Little documentation of the Corallochytrium life cycle exists. However it is known that Corallochytrium'' produces colonies by binary, palintomic cell division (Raghu-kumar, 1987). Completion of the Corallochytrium life cycle involves the release of limax-shaped spores (Raghu-kumar, 1987).

References

 Cavalier-Smith, T.  2001.“What are Fungi” in The Mycota VIII: 3–30.
 Cavalier-Smith, T., Allsopp, P. 1996. Corallochytrium, an enigmatic non-flagellate protozoan related to choanoflagellates. Protistology. 32(3): 306–310. doi: 10.1016/S0932-4739(96)80053-8
 Hehenberger et al. 2017. Novel predators reshape holozoan phylogeny and reveal the presence of a two-component signaling system in the ancestor of animals. Current Biol. 27: 2043-2050. doi: 10.1016/j.cub.2017.06.006
 “Chytrium”. Merriam-Webster. retrieved from: https://www.merriam-webster.com/dictionary/Chytrium
 Marshall, W. 2014. Ichythyosporea. Mesomycetozoa, Mesomycetozoa. Version 6 December 2014 (under construction). Retrieved from: http://tolweb.org/Ichthyosporea/121172/2014.12.06 in Tree of Life Web Project.
 Raghu-kumar, S. 1987. Occurrence of the Thraustochytrid, Corallochytrium limacisporum gen. et sp. nov. in the coral reef lagoons of the Lakshadweep Islands in the Arabian Sea. Botanica Marina. 30: 83–89. doi: 10.1515/botm.1987.30.1.83
 Sumathi, J.C., Raghukumar, S., Kasbekar, D.P., Raghukumar, C. 2006. Molecular evidence of fungal signatures in the marine protist Corallochytrium limacisporum and its implications in the evolution of animals and fungi. Protist. 157(4): 363-373. doi: 10.1016/j.protis.2006.05.003
 Torruella et al. 2015. Phylogenomics reveal convergent evolution of lifestyles in close relatives of animals and fungi. Current Biology. 25(18): 2404–2410. doi: 10.1016/j.cub.2015.07.053

Choanoflagellatea